is a Japanese politician serving in the House of Representatives in the Diet (national legislature) as a member of the Democratic Party for the People (DPP). A native of Tsuyama, Okayama, he attended the University of Tokyo and received an MBA from Oxford University. He was elected for the first time in 2003.

Tsumura ran in the 2018 DPFP leadership election, being one of the two candidates beside Yuichiro Tamaki.

References

External links
 Official website

Living people
1971 births
Democratic Party of Japan politicians
Members of the House of Representatives (Japan)
21st-century Japanese politicians
University of Tokyo alumni
Alumni of the University of Oxford
Alumni of Saïd Business School